Events from the year 1799 in Sweden

Incumbents
 Monarch – Gustav IV Adolf

Events

 - Coffee is banned: due to the opposition, this unpopular law is abolished again in 1802. 
 - Maximum seu archimetria by Thomas Thorild

Births
 13 March - Maria Dorothea Dunckel, playwright  (died 1878)
 22 March  – Fredrik Vilhelm August Argelander
 24 March - Nils Almlöf, actor (died 1875)
 31 October - Maria Fredrica von Stedingk, composer (died 1868)
 9 November -  Gustav, Prince of Vasa, prince (died 1877)
 11 December - Charlotte Thitz, educator (died 1889)
 Helena Larsdotter Westerlund, educator (died 1865)

Deaths

 
 2 February - Dorothea Maria Lösch, war heroine  (born 1730)
 11 March - Anna Lisa Jermen, entrepreneur (born 1770) 
 25 May - Barbara Ekenberg, entrepreneur (born 1717) 
 Anna Elisabeth Baer, ship owner  (born 1722)
 Anna Maria Brandel, industrialist (born 1725)

References

 
Years of the 18th century in Sweden